The Solar System is the gravitationally bound system of the Sun and the objects that orbit it. It formed 4.6 billion years ago from the gravitational collapse of a giant interstellar molecular cloud. The vast majority (99.86%) of the system's mass is in the Sun, with most of the remaining mass contained in the planet Jupiter. The planetary system around the Sun contains eight planets. The four inner system planets—Mercury, Venus, Earth and Mars—are terrestrial planets, being composed primarily of rock and metal. The four giant planets of the outer system are substantially larger and more massive than the terrestrials. The two largest, Jupiter and Saturn, are gas giants, being composed mainly of hydrogen and helium; the next two, Uranus and Neptune, are ice giants, being composed mostly of volatile substances with relatively high melting points compared with hydrogen and helium, such as water, ammonia, and methane. All eight planets have nearly circular orbits that lie near the plane of Earth's orbit, called the ecliptic.

There are an unknown number of smaller dwarf planets and innumerable small Solar System bodies orbiting the Sun. Six of the major planets, the six largest possible dwarf planets, and many of the smaller bodies are orbited by natural satellites, commonly called "moons" after Earth's Moon. Two natural satellites, Jupiter's moon Ganymede and Saturn's moon Titan, are larger than Mercury, the smallest terrestrial planet, though less massive, and Jupiter's moon Callisto is nearly as large. Each of the giant planets and some smaller bodies are encircled by planetary rings of ice, dust and moonlets. The asteroid belt, which lies between the orbits of Mars and Jupiter, contains objects composed of rock, metal and ice. Beyond Neptune's orbit lie the Kuiper belt and scattered disc, which are populations of objects composed mostly of ice and rock.

In the outer reaches of the Solar System lies a class of minor planets called detached objects. There is considerable debate as to how many such objects there will prove to be. Some of these objects are large enough to have rounded under their own gravity and thus to be categorized as dwarf planets. Various small-body populations, including comets, centaurs and interplanetary dust clouds, freely travel between the regions of the Solar System.

The solar wind, a stream of charged particles flowing outwards from the Sun, creates a bubble-like region of interplanetary medium in the interstellar medium known as the heliosphere. The heliopause is the point at which pressure from the solar wind is equal to the opposing pressure of the interstellar medium; it extends out to the edge of the scattered disc. The Oort cloud, which is thought to be the source for long-period comets, may also exist at a distance roughly a thousand times further than the heliosphere. The Solar System is located 26,000 light-years from the center of the Milky Way galaxy in the Orion Arm, which contains most of the visible stars in the night sky. The nearest stars are within the so-called Local Bubble, with the closest, Proxima Centauri, at 4.2441 light-years.

Formation and evolution 

The Solar System formed 4.568 billion years ago from the gravitational collapse of a region within a large molecular cloud. This initial cloud was likely several light-years across and probably birthed several stars. As is typical of molecular clouds, this one consisted mostly of hydrogen, with some helium, and small amounts of heavier elements fused by previous generations of stars. As the region that would become the Solar System, known as the pre-solar nebula, collapsed, conservation of angular momentum caused it to rotate faster. The centre, where most of the mass collected, became increasingly hotter than the surrounding disc. The planets formed by accretion from this disc, in which dust and gas gravitationally attracted each other, coalescing to form ever larger bodies. Hundreds of protoplanets may have existed in the early Solar System, but they either merged or were destroyed or ejected, leaving the planets, dwarf planets, and leftover minor bodies.

Due to their higher boiling points, only metals and silicates could exist in solid form in the warm inner Solar System close to the Sun, and these would eventually form the rocky planets of Mercury, Venus, Earth, and Mars. Because metallic elements only comprised a very small fraction of the solar nebula, the terrestrial planets could not grow very large. The giant planets (Jupiter, Saturn, Uranus, and Neptune) formed further out, beyond the frost line, the point between the orbits of Mars and Jupiter where material is cool enough for volatile icy compounds to remain solid. The ices that formed these planets were more plentiful than the metals and silicates that formed the terrestrial inner planets, allowing them to grow massive enough to capture large atmospheres of hydrogen and helium, the lightest and most abundant elements. Leftover debris that never became planets congregated in regions such as the asteroid belt, Kuiper belt, and Oort cloud. The Nice model is an explanation for the creation of these regions and how the outer planets could have formed in different positions and migrated to their current orbits through various gravitational interactions.

Within 50 million years, the pressure and density of hydrogen in the centre of the protostar became great enough for it to begin thermonuclear fusion. The temperature, reaction rate, pressure, and density increased until hydrostatic equilibrium was achieved: the thermal pressure counterbalancing the force of gravity. At this point, the Sun became a main-sequence star. The main-sequence phase, from beginning to end, will last about 10 billion years for the Sun compared to around two billion years for all other phases of the Sun's pre-remnant life combined. Solar wind from the Sun created the heliosphere and swept away the remaining gas and dust from the protoplanetary disc into interstellar space. As helium accumulates at its core the Sun is growing brighter; early in its main-sequence life its brightness was 70% that of what it is today.

The Solar System will remain roughly as it is known today until the hydrogen in the core of the Sun has been entirely converted to helium, which will occur roughly 5 billion years from now. This will mark the end of the Sun's main-sequence life. At that time, the core of the Sun will contract with hydrogen fusion occurring along a shell surrounding the inert helium, and the energy output will be greater than at present. The outer layers of the Sun will expand to roughly 260 times its current diameter, and the Sun will become a red giant. Because of its increased surface area, the surface of the Sun will be cooler ( at its coolest) than it is on the main sequence.

The expanding Sun is expected to vaporize Mercury as well as Venus, and render Earth uninhabitable (possibly destroying it as well). Eventually, the core will be hot enough for helium fusion; the Sun will burn helium for a fraction of the time it burned hydrogen in the core. The Sun is not massive enough to commence the fusion of heavier elements, and nuclear reactions in the core will dwindle. Its outer layers will be ejected into space, leaving behind a dense white dwarf, half the original mass of the Sun but only the size of Earth. The ejected outer layers will form what is known as a planetary nebula, returning some of the material that formed the Sun—but now enriched with heavier elements like carbon—to the interstellar medium.

Structure and composition

The word solar means "pertaining to the Sun", which is derived from the Latin word sol, meaning Sun. The Sun is the dominant gravitational member of the Solar System, and its planetary system is maintained in a relatively stable, slowly evolving state by following isolated, gravitationally bound orbits around the Sun.

Orbits 

The planets and other large objects in orbit around the Sun lie near the plane of Earth's orbit, known as the ecliptic. Smaller icy objects such as comets frequently orbit at significantly greater angles to this plane. Most of the planets in the Solar System have secondary systems of their own, being orbited by natural satellites called moons. Many of the largest natural satellites are in synchronous rotation, with one face permanently turned toward their parent. The four giant planets have planetary rings, thin bands of tiny particles that orbit them in unison.

As a result of the formation of the Solar System, planets and most other objects orbit the Sun in the same direction that the Sun is rotating. That is, counter-clockwise, as viewed from above Earth's north pole. There are exceptions, such as Halley's Comet. Most of the larger moons orbit their planets in prograde direction, matching the planetary rotation; Neptune's moon Triton is the largest to orbit in the opposite, retrograde manner. Most larger objects rotate around their own axes in the prograde direction relative to their orbit, though the rotation of Venus is retrograde.

To a good first approximation, Kepler's laws of planetary motion describe the orbits of objects about the Sun. These laws stipulate that each object travels along an ellipse with the Sun at one focus, which causes the body's distance from the Sun to vary over the course of its year. A body's closest approach to the Sun is called its perihelion, whereas its most distant point from the Sun is called its aphelion. The orbits of the planets are nearly circular, but many comets, asteroids, and Kuiper belt objects follow highly elliptical orbits. Kepler's laws only account for the influence of the Sun's gravity upon an orbiting body, not the gravitational pulls of different bodies upon each other. On a human time scale, these additional perturbations can be accounted for using numerical models, but the planetary system can change chaotically over billions of years.

The angular momentum of the Solar System is a measure of the total amount of orbital and rotational momentum possessed by all its moving components. Although the Sun dominates the system by mass, it accounts for only about 2% of the angular momentum. The planets, dominated by Jupiter, account for most of the rest of the angular momentum due to the combination of their mass, orbit, and distance from the Sun, with a possibly significant contribution from comets.

Composition 
The overall structure of the charted regions of the Solar System consists of the Sun, four smaller inner planets surrounded by a belt of mostly rocky asteroids, and four giant planets surrounded by the Kuiper belt of mostly icy objects. Astronomers sometimes informally divide this structure into separate regions. The inner Solar System includes the four terrestrial planets and the asteroid belt. The outer Solar System is beyond the asteroids, including the four giant planets. Since the discovery of the Kuiper belt, the outermost parts of the Solar System are considered a distinct region consisting of the objects beyond Neptune.

The principal component of the Solar System is the Sun, a low-mass star that contains 99.86% of the system's known mass and dominates it gravitationally. The Sun's four largest orbiting bodies, the giant planets, account for 99% of the remaining mass, with Jupiter and Saturn together comprising more than 90%. The remaining objects of the Solar System (including the four terrestrial planets, the dwarf planets, moons, asteroids, and comets) together comprise less than 0.002% of the Solar System's total mass.

The Sun is composed of roughly 98% hydrogen and helium, as are Jupiter and Saturn. A composition gradient exists in the Solar System, created by heat and light pressure from the early Sun; those objects closer to the Sun, which are more affected by heat and light pressure, are composed of elements with high melting points. Objects farther from the Sun are composed largely of materials with lower melting points. The boundary in the Solar System beyond which those volatile substances could coalesce is known as the frost line, and it lies at roughly five times the Earth's distance from the Sun.

The objects of the inner Solar System are composed mostly of rocky materials, such as silicates, iron or nickel. Jupiter and Saturn are composed mainly of gases with extremely low melting points and high vapour pressure, such as hydrogen, helium, and neon. Ices, like water, methane, ammonia, hydrogen sulfide, and carbon dioxide, have melting points up to a few hundred kelvins. They can be found as ices, liquids, or gases in various places in the Solar System. Icy substances comprise the majority of the satellites of the giant planets, as well as most of Uranus and Neptune (the so-called "ice giants") and the numerous small objects that lie beyond Neptune's orbit. Together, gases and ices are referred to as volatiles.

Distances and scales 

The astronomical unit [AU] would be the distance from the Earth to the Sun if the planet's orbit were perfectly circular. Thus, the Sun occupies 0.00001% (10−5 %) of the volume of a sphere with a radius the size of Earth's orbit, whereas Earth's volume is roughly one millionth (10−6) that of the Sun.

With a few exceptions, the farther a planet or belt is from the Sun, the larger the distance between its orbit and the orbit of the next nearer object to the Sun. For example, Venus is approximately 0.33 AU farther out from the Sun than Mercury, whereas Saturn is 4.3 AU out from Jupiter, and Neptune lies 10.5 AU out from Uranus. Attempts have been made to determine a relationship between these orbital distances, like the Titius–Bode law and Johannes Kepler's model based on the Platonic solids, but ongoing discoveries have invalidated these hypotheses.

Some Solar System models attempt to convey the relative scales involved in the Solar System on human terms. Some are small in scale (and may be mechanical—called orreries)—whereas others extend across cities or regional areas. The largest such scale model, the Sweden Solar System, uses the 110-metre (361 ft) Avicii Arena in Stockholm as its substitute Sun, and, following the scale, Jupiter is a 7.5-metre (25-foot) sphere at Stockholm Arlanda Airport, 40 km (25 mi) away, whereas the farthest current object, Sedna, is a 10 cm (4 in) sphere in Luleå, 912 km (567 mi) away.

Sun 

The Sun is the Solar System's star and by far its most massive component. Its large mass (332,900 Earth masses), which comprises 99.86% of all the mass in the Solar System, produces temperatures and densities in its core high enough to sustain nuclear fusion of hydrogen into helium. This releases an enormous amount of energy, mostly radiated into space as electromagnetic radiation peaking in visible light.

Because the Sun fuses hydrogen into helium at its core, it is a main-sequence star. More specifically, it is a G2-type main-sequence star, where the type designation refers to its effective temperature. Hotter main-sequence stars are more luminous. The Sun's temperature is intermediate between that of the hottest stars and that of the coolest stars. Stars brighter and hotter than the Sun are rare, whereas substantially dimmer and cooler stars, known as red dwarfs, make up about 75% of the stars in the Milky Way.

The Sun is a population I star; it has a higher abundance of elements heavier than hydrogen and helium ("metals" in astronomical parlance) than the older population II stars. Elements heavier than hydrogen and helium were formed in the cores of ancient and exploding stars, so the first generation of stars had to die before the universe could be enriched with these atoms. The oldest stars contain few metals, whereas stars born later have more. This higher metallicity is thought to have been crucial to the Sun's development of a planetary system because the planets form from the accretion of "metals".

Environment and habitability 

Outside of the main part of the Sun's atmosphere extends the heliosphere and dominates the Solar planetary system. The vast majority of the heliosphere is occupied by a near-vacuum known as the interplanetary medium. Along with light, the Sun radiates a continuous stream of charged particles (a plasma) called the solar wind. Activity on the Sun's surface, such as solar flares and coronal mass ejections, disturbs the heliosphere, creating space weather and causing geomagnetic storms. The largest structure within the heliosphere is the heliospheric current sheet, a spiral form created by the actions of the Sun's rotating magnetic field on the interplanetary medium.

Earth's magnetic field stops its atmosphere from being stripped away by the solar wind. Venus and Mars do not have magnetic fields, and as a result the solar wind is causing their atmospheres to gradually bleed away into space. Coronal mass ejections and similar events blow a magnetic field and huge quantities of material from the surface of the Sun. The interaction of this magnetic field and material with Earth's magnetic field funnels charged particles into Earth's upper atmosphere, where its interactions create aurorae seen near the magnetic poles.

The heliosphere and planetary magnetic fields (for those planets that have them) partially shield the Solar System from high-energy interstellar particles called cosmic rays. The density of cosmic rays in the interstellar medium and the strength of the Sun's magnetic field change on very long timescales, so the level of cosmic-ray penetration in the Solar System varies, though by how much is unknown.

The interplanetary medium is home to at least two disc-like regions of cosmic dust. The first, the zodiacal dust cloud, lies in the inner Solar System and causes the zodiacal light. It may have been formed by collisions within the asteroid belt brought on by gravitational interactions with the planets; a more recent proposed origin is the planet Mars.

The zone of habitability of the Solar System is located in the Inner Solar System. Beside the Solar conditions for habitability on Solar System objects such as Earth, habitability might be possibly in subsurface oceans of various Outer Solar System moons.

Inner Solar System 

The inner Solar System is the region comprising the terrestrial planets and the asteroid belt. Composed mainly of silicates and metals, the objects of the inner Solar System are relatively close to the Sun; the radius of this entire region is less than the distance between the orbits of Jupiter and Saturn.

Inner planets 

The four terrestrial or inner planets have dense, rocky compositions, few or no moons, and no ring systems. They are composed largely of refractory minerals such as the silicateswhich form their crusts and mantlesand metals such as iron and nickel which form their cores. Three of the four inner planets (Venus, Earth and Mars) have atmospheres substantial enough to generate weather; all have impact craters and tectonic surface features, such as rift valleys and volcanoes. The term inner planet should not be confused with inferior planet, which designates those planets that are closer to the Sun than Earth is (i.e. Mercury and Venus).

Mercury 

Mercury ( from the Sun) is the closest planet to the Sun. The smallest planet in the Solar System, Mercury has no natural satellites. The dominant geological features are impact craters or basins with ejecta blankets, the remains of early volcanic activity including magma flows, and lobed ridges or rupes that were probably produced by a period of contraction early in the planet's history. Mercury's very tenuous atmosphere consists of solar-wind particles trapped by Mercury's magnetic field, as well as atoms blasted off its surface by the solar wind. Its relatively large iron core and thin mantle have not yet been adequately explained. Hypotheses include that its outer layers were stripped off by a giant impact, or that it was prevented from fully accreting by the young Sun's energy.

There have been searches for "Vulcanoids", asteroids in stable orbits between Mercury and the Sun, but none have been discovered.

Venus 

Venus ( from the Sun) is close in size to Earth and, like Earth, has a thick silicate mantle around an iron core, a substantial atmosphere, and evidence of internal geological activity. It is much drier than Earth, and its atmosphere is ninety times as dense. Venus has no natural satellites. The planet has no magnetic field that would prevent depletion of its substantial atmosphere, which suggests that its atmosphere is being replenished by volcanic eruptions. A relatively young planetary surface displays extensive evidence of volcanic activity, but is devoid of plate tectonics. It may undergo resurfacing episodes on a time scale of 700 million years.

Earth 

Earth ( from the Sun) is the largest and densest of the inner planets, the only one known to have current geological activity, and the only place where life is known to exist. Its liquid hydrosphere is unique among the terrestrial planets, and it is the only planet where plate tectonics has been observed. Earth's atmosphere is radically different from those of the other planets, having been altered by the presence of life to contain 21% free oxygen. The planetary magnetosphere shields the surface from solar and cosmic radiation, limiting atmospheric stripping and maintaining habitability. It has one natural satellite, the Moon, the only large satellite of a terrestrial planet in the Solar System.

Mars 

Mars ( from the Sun) is smaller than Earth and Venus. Its surface, peppered with volcanoes, such as Olympus Mons, and rift valleys, such as Valles Marineris, shows geological activity that may have persisted until as recently as 2 million years ago. Its red colour comes from iron oxide (rust) in its soil. Mars has two tiny natural satellites (Deimos and Phobos) thought to be either captured asteroids, or ejected debris from a massive impact early in Mars's history.

Asteroid belt 

Asteroids except for the largest, Ceres, are classified as small Solar System bodies and are composed mainly of refractory rocky and metallic minerals, with some ice. They range from a few metres to hundreds of kilometres in size. Asteroids smaller than one meter are usually called meteoroids and micrometeoroids (grain-sized), with the exact division between the two categories being debated over the years. As of 2017, the IAU designates asteroids having diameter between about 30 micrometres and 1 metre as micrometeroids, and terms smaller particles "dust".

It is thought to be remnants from the Solar System's formation that failed to coalesce because of the gravitational interference of Jupiter. The asteroid belt contains tens of thousands, possibly millions, of objects over one kilometre in diameter. Despite this, the total mass of the asteroid belt is unlikely to be more than a thousandth of that of Earth. The asteroid belt is very sparsely populated; spacecraft routinely pass through without incident.

Ceres 

Ceres ( from the Sun) is the largest asteroid, a protoplanet, and a dwarf planet. It has a diameter of slightly under  and a mass large enough for its own gravity to pull it into a spherical shape. Ceres was considered a planet when it was discovered in 1801, but as further observations revealed additional asteroids, it became common to consider it as one of the minor rather than major planets. It was then reclassified again as a dwarf planet in 2006 when the IAU definition of planet was established.

Pallas and Vesta 

Pallas (2.77 AU from the Sun) and Vesta (2.36 AU from the Sun) are the largest asteroids in the asteroid belt, after Ceres. They are the other two protoplanets that survive more or less intact. Fragments from impacts upon these two bodies survive elsewhere in the asteroid belt, as the Pallas family and Vesta family. Both were considered planets upon their discoveries in 1802 and 1807 respectively, and then like Ceres generally considered as minor planets with the discovery of more asteroids. Some authors today have begun to consider Pallas and Vesta as planets again, along with Ceres, under geophysical definitions of the term.

Asteroid groups 
Asteroids in the asteroid belt are divided into asteroid groups and families based on their orbital characteristics. Kirkwood gaps are sharp dips in the distribution of asteroid orbits that correspond to orbital resonances with Jupiter. Asteroid moons are asteroids that orbit larger asteroids. They are not as clearly distinguished as planetary moons, sometimes being almost as large as their partners (e.g. that of 90 Antiope). The asteroid belt includes main-belt comets, which may have been the source of Earth's water.

Jupiter trojans are located in either of Jupiter's L4 or L5 points (gravitationally stable regions leading and trailing a planet in its orbit); the term  is also used for small bodies in any other planetary or satellite Lagrange point. Hilda asteroids are in a 2:3 resonance with Jupiter; that is, they go around the Sun three times for every two Jupiter orbits. The inner Solar System contains near-Earth asteroids, many of which cross the orbits of the inner planets. Some of them are potentially hazardous objects.

Outer Solar System 

The outer region of the Solar System is home to the giant planets and their large moons. The centaurs and many short-period comets also orbit in this region. Due to their greater distance from the Sun, the solid objects in the outer Solar System contain a higher proportion of volatiles, such as water, ammonia, and methane than those of the inner Solar System because the lower temperatures allow these compounds to remain solid.

Outer planets 

The four outer planets, also called giant planets or Jovian planets, collectively make up 99% of the mass known to orbit the Sun. Jupiter and Saturn are together more than 400 times the mass of Earth and consist overwhelmingly of the gases hydrogen and helium, hence their designation as gas giants. Uranus and Neptune are far less massiveless than 20 Earth masses eachand are composed primarily of ices. For these reasons, some astronomers suggest they belong in their own category, ice giants. All four giant planets have rings, although only Saturn's ring system is easily observed from Earth. The term superior planet designates planets outside Earth's orbit and thus includes both the outer planets and Mars.

The ring–moon systems of Jupiter, Saturn, and Uranus are like miniature versions of the Solar System; that of Neptune is significantly different, having been disrupted by the capture of its largest moon Triton.

Jupiter 

It is composed largely of hydrogen and helium. Jupiter's strong internal heat creates semi-permanent features in its atmosphere, such as cloud bands and the Great Red Spot. The planet possesses a 4.2– strength magnetosphere that spans 22–29 million km, making it, in certain respects, the largest object in the Solar System. Jupiter has 95 known satellites. The four largest, Ganymede, Callisto, Io, and Europa, are called the Galilean moons: they show similarities to the terrestrial planets, such as volcanism and internal heating. Ganymede, the largest satellite in the Solar System, is larger than Mercury; Callisto is almost as large.

Saturn 

Saturn ( from the Sun), distinguished by its extensive ring system, has several similarities to Jupiter, such as its atmospheric composition and magnetosphere. Saturn is the only planet of the Solar System that is less dense than water. The rings of Saturn are made up of small ice and rock particles. Saturn has 83 confirmed satellites composed largely of ice. Two of these, Titan and Enceladus, show signs of geological activity; they, as well as five other Saturnian moons (Iapetus, Rhea, Dione, Tethys, and Mimas), are large enough to be round. Titan, the second-largest moon in the Solar System, is bigger than Mercury and the only satellite in the Solar System to have a substantial atmosphere.

Uranus 
Uniquely among the planets, it orbits the Sun on its side; its axial tilt is over ninety degrees to the ecliptic. This gives the planet extreme seasonal variation as each pole points toward and then away from the Sun. It has a much colder core than the other giant planets and radiates very little heat into space. As a consequence, it has the coldest planetary atmosphere in the Solar System. Uranus has 27 known satellites, the largest ones being Titania, Oberon, Umbriel, Ariel, and Miranda. Like the other giant planets, it possesses a ring system and magnetosphere.

Neptune 

Neptune ( from the Sun), though slightly smaller than Uranus, is more massive and hence more dense. It radiates more internal heat than Uranus, but not as much as Jupiter or Saturn. Neptune has 14 known satellites. The largest, Triton, is geologically active, with geysers of liquid nitrogen. Triton is the only large satellite with a retrograde orbit, which indicates that it did not form with Neptune, but was probably captured from the Kuiper belt. Neptune is accompanied in its orbit by several minor planets, termed Neptune trojans, that either lead or trail the planet by about one-sixth of the way around the Sun, positions known as Lagrange points.

Centaurs 

The centaurs are icy comet-like bodies whose orbits have semi-major axes greater than Jupiter's and less than Neptune's. These are former Kuiper belt and scattered disc objects that were gravitationally perturbed closer to the Sun by the outer planets, and are expected to become comets or get ejected out of the Solar System. While most centaurs are inactive and asteroid-like, some exhibit clear cometary activity, such as the first centaur discovered, 2060 Chiron, which has been classified as a comet (95P) because it develops a coma just as comets do when they approach the Sun.

Comets 

Comets are small Solar System bodies, typically only a few kilometres across, composed largely of volatile ices. They have highly eccentric orbits, generally a perihelion within the orbits of the inner planets and an aphelion far beyond Pluto. When a comet enters the inner Solar System, its proximity to the Sun causes its icy surface to sublimate and ionise, creating a coma: a long tail of gas and dust often visible to the naked eye.

Short-period comets have orbits lasting less than two hundred years. Long-period comets have orbits lasting thousands of years. Short-period comets are thought to originate in the Kuiper belt, whereas long-period comets, such as Hale–Bopp, are thought to originate in the Oort cloud. Many comet groups, such as the Kreutz sungrazers, formed from the breakup of a single parent. Some comets with hyperbolic orbits may originate outside the Solar System, but determining their precise orbits is difficult. Old comets whose volatiles have mostly been driven out by solar warming are often categorised as asteroids.

Trans-Neptunian region 
 

Inside the orbit of Neptune is the planetary region of the Solar System. Beyond the orbit of Neptune lies the area of the "trans-Neptunian region", with the doughnut-shaped Kuiper belt, home of Pluto and several other dwarf planets, and an overlapping disc of scattered objects, which is tilted toward the plane of the Solar System and reaches much further out than the Kuiper belt. The entire region is still largely unexplored. It appears to consist overwhelmingly of many thousands of small worlds—the largest having a diameter only a fifth that of Earth and a mass far smaller than that of the Moon—composed mainly of rock and ice. This region is sometimes described as the "third zone of the Solar System", enclosing the inner and the outer Solar System.

Kuiper belt 
The Kuiper belt is a great ring of debris similar to the asteroid belt, but consisting mainly of objects composed primarily of ice. It is composed mainly of small Solar System bodies, although the largest few are probably large enough to be dwarf planets. Many Kuiper belt objects have satellites, and most have orbits that take them outside the plane of the ecliptic.

The Kuiper belt can be roughly divided into the "classical" belt and the resonant trans-Neptunian objects. The latter have orbits whose periods are in a simple ratio to that of Neptune: for example, going around the Sun twice for every three times that Neptune does, or once for every two. Members of the classical Kuiper belt are sometimes called "cubewanos", after the first of their kind to be discovered, originally designated 1992 QB1; they are still in near primordial, low-eccentricity orbits.

Pluto and Charon 

When discovered in 1930, it was considered to be the ninth planet; this changed in 2006 with the adoption of a formal definition of planet. Pluto has a 2:3 resonance with Neptune, meaning that Pluto orbits twice round the Sun for every three Neptunian orbits. Kuiper belt objects whose orbits share this resonance are called plutinos.

Charon, the largest of Pluto's moons, is sometimes described as part of a binary system with Pluto, as the two bodies orbit a barycentre of gravity above their surfaces (i.e. they appear to "orbit each other"). Beyond Charon, four much smaller moons, Styx, Nix, Kerberos, and Hydra, orbit Pluto.

Others 

Besides Pluto, astronomers generally agree that at least four other Kuiper belt objects are dwarf planets, and additional bodies have also been proposed:

 Makemake (45.79 AU average from the Sun), although smaller than Pluto, is the largest known object in the classical Kuiper belt (that is, a Kuiper belt object not in a confirmed resonance with Neptune). Makemake is the brightest object in the Kuiper belt after Pluto. Discovered in 2005, it was officially named in 2009. Its orbit is far more inclined than Pluto's, at 29°. It has one known moon.
 Haumea (43.13 AU average from the Sun) is in an orbit similar to Makemake, except that it is in a temporary 7:12 orbital resonance with Neptune. Like Makemake, it was discovered in 2005. Uniquely among the dwarf planets, Haumea possess a ring system, two known moons named Hiʻiaka and Namaka, and rotates so quickly (once every 3.9 hours) that it is stretched into an ellipsoid. It is part of a collisional family of Kuiper belt objects that share similar orbits, which suggests a giant collision took place on Haumea and ejected its fragments into space billions of years ago. Haumea 
  (43.69 AU average from the Sun) is the second-largest known object in the classical Kuiper belt, after Makemake. Its orbit is significantly less eccentric and inclined than those of Makemake or Haumea. It possesses a ring system and one known moon, Weywot.
  (39.40 AU average from the Sun) is in the same 2:3 orbital resonance with Neptune as Pluto, and is the largest such object after Pluto itself. Its eccentricity and inclination are similar to Pluto's, but its perihelion lies about 120° from that of Pluto. Thus, the phase of Orcus's orbit is opposite to Pluto's: Orcus is at aphelion (most recently in 2019) around when Pluto is at perihelion (most recently in 1989) and vice versa. For this reason, it has been called the anti-Pluto. It has one known moon, Vanth.

Scattered disc 

The scattered disc, which overlaps the Kuiper belt but extends out to near 500 AU, is thought to be the source of short-period comets. Scattered-disc objects are believed to have been perturbed into erratic orbits by the gravitational influence of Neptune's early outward migration. Most scattered disc objects (SDOs) have perihelia within the Kuiper belt but aphelia far beyond it (some more than 150 AU from the Sun). SDOs' orbits can also be inclined up to 46.8° from the ecliptic plane. Some astronomers consider the scattered disc to be merely another region of the Kuiper belt and describe scattered-disc objects as "scattered Kuiper belt objects". Some astronomers also classify centaurs as inward-scattered Kuiper belt objects along with the outward-scattered residents of the scattered disc.

Eris and Gonggong 
 (67.78 AU average from the Sun) is the largest known scattered disc object, and caused a debate about what constitutes a planet, because it is 25% more massive than Pluto and about the same diameter. It is the most massive of the known dwarf planets. It has one known moon, Dysnomia. Like Pluto, its orbit is highly eccentric, with a perihelion of 38.2 AU (roughly Pluto's distance from the Sun) and an aphelion of 97.6 AU, and steeply inclined to the ecliptic plane at an angle of 44°.

 (67.38 AU average from the Sun) is another dwarf planet in a comparable orbit to Eris, except that it is in a 3:10 resonance with Neptune. It has one known moon, Xiangliu.

Farthest regions 
The point at which the Solar System ends and interstellar space begins is not precisely defined because its outer boundaries are shaped by two forces, the solar wind and the Sun's gravity. The limit of the solar wind's influence is roughly four times Pluto's distance from the Sun; this heliopause, the outer boundary of the heliosphere, is considered the beginning of the interstellar medium. The Sun's Hill sphere, the effective range of its gravitational dominance, is thought to extend up to a thousand times farther and encompasses the hypothetical Oort cloud.

Edge of the heliosphere 

The Sun's stellar-wind bubble, the heliosphere, a region of space dominated by the Sun, has its boundary at the termination shock, which is roughly 80–100 AU from the Sun upwind of the interstellar medium and roughly 200 AU from the Sun downwind. Here the solar wind collides with the interstellar medium and dramatically slows, condenses and becomes more turbulent, forming a great oval structure known as the heliosheath. This structure has been theorized to look and behave very much like a comet's tail, extending outward for a further 40 AU on the upwind side but tailing many times that distance downwind. Evidence from the Cassini and Interstellar Boundary Explorer spacecraft has suggested that it is forced into a bubble shape by the constraining action of the interstellar magnetic field, but the actual shape remains unknown.

The outer boundary of the heliosphere, the heliopause, is the point at which the solar wind finally terminates and is the beginning of interstellar space. Voyager 1 and Voyager 2 passed the termination shock and entered the heliosheath at 94 and 84 AU from the Sun, respectively. Voyager 1 was reported to have crossed the heliopause in August 2012, and Voyager 2 in December 2018.

The shape and form of the outer edge of the heliosphere is likely affected by the fluid dynamics of interactions with the interstellar medium as well as solar magnetic fields prevailing to the south, e.g. it is bluntly shaped with the northern hemisphere extending 9 AU farther than the southern hemisphere. Beyond the heliopause, at around 230 AU, lies the bow shock, a plasma "wake" left by the Sun as it travels through the Milky Way.

Detached objects 

 (with an average orbit of 520 AU from the Sun) is a large, reddish object with a gigantic, highly elliptical orbit that takes it from about 76 AU at perihelion to 940 AU at aphelion and takes 11,400 years to complete. Mike Brown, who discovered the object in 2003, asserts that it cannot be part of the scattered disc or the Kuiper belt because its perihelion is too distant to have been affected by Neptune's migration. He and other astronomers consider it to be the first in an entirely new population, sometimes termed "distant detached objects" (DDOs), which also may include the object , which has a perihelion of 45 AU, an aphelion of 415 AU, and an orbital period of 3,420 years. Brown terms this population the "inner Oort cloud" because it may have formed through a similar process, although it is far closer to the Sun. Sedna is very likely a dwarf planet, though its shape has yet to be determined. Its aphelion is only about half that of Sedna's, at 458 AU.

Oort cloud 

The Oort cloud is a hypothetical spherical cloud of up to a trillion icy objects that is thought to be the source for all long-period comets and to surround the Solar System at roughly 50,000 AU (around 1 light-year (ly)) from the Sun, and possibly to as far as 100,000 AU (1.87 ly). It is thought to be composed of comets that were ejected from the inner Solar System by gravitational interactions with the outer planets. Oort cloud objects move very slowly, and can be perturbed by infrequent events, such as collisions, the gravitational effects of a passing star, or the galactic tide, the tidal force exerted by the Milky Way.

Boundaries 

Much of the Solar System is still unknown. The Sun's gravitational field is estimated to dominate the gravitational forces of surrounding stars out to about two light-years (125,000 AU). Lower estimates for the radius of the Oort cloud, by contrast, do not place it farther than 50,000 AU. Most of the mass is orbiting in the region between 3,000 and 100,000 AU. Despite discoveries such as Sedna, the region between the Kuiper belt and the Oort cloud, an area tens of thousands of AU in radius, is still virtually unmapped. Learning about this region of space is difficult, because it depends upon inferences from those few objects whose orbits happen to be perturbed such that they fall closer to the Sun, and even then, detecting these objects has often been possible only when they happened to become bright enough to register as comets. Objects may yet be discovered in the Solar System's uncharted regions. The furthest known objects, such as Comet West, have aphelia around 70,000 AU from the Sun.

Galactic context 

The Solar System is located in the Milky Way, a barred spiral galaxy with a diameter of about 100,000 light-years containing more than 100 billion stars. The Sun resides in one of the Milky Way's outer spiral arms, known as the Orion–Cygnus Arm or Local Spur. The Sun lies about 26,660 light-years from the Galactic Center (where the supermassive black hole Sagittarius A* is located), and its speed around the center of the Milky Way is about 220 km/s, so that it completes one revolution every 240 million years. This revolution is known as the Solar System's galactic year. The solar apex, the direction of the Sun's path through interstellar space, is near the constellation Hercules in the direction of the current location of the bright star Vega. The plane of the ecliptic lies at an angle of about 60° to the galactic plane.

The Solar System's location in the Milky Way is a factor in the evolutionary history of life on Earth. Its orbit is close to circular, and orbits near the Sun are at roughly the same speed as that of the spiral arms. Therefore, the Sun passes through arms only rarely. Because spiral arms are home to a far larger concentration of supernovae, gravitational instabilities, and radiation that could disrupt the Solar System, this has given Earth long periods of stability for life to evolve. However, the changing position of the Solar System relative to other parts of the Milky Way could explain periodic extinction events on Earth, according to the Shiva hypothesis or related theories, but this remains controversial.

The Solar System lies well outside the star-crowded environs of the galactic centre. Near the centre, gravitational tugs from nearby stars could perturb bodies in the Oort cloud and send many comets into the inner Solar System, producing collisions with potentially catastrophic implications for life on Earth. The intense radiation of the galactic centre could also interfere with the development of complex life. Stellar flybys that pass within  of the Sun occur roughly once every 100,000 years.

Celestial neighbourhood 

The Solar System is surrounded by the Local Interstellar Cloud, although it is not clear if it is embedded in the Local Interstellar Cloud or if it lies just outside the cloud's edge. Multiple other interstellar clouds also exist in the region within 300 light-years of the Sun, known as the Local Bubble. The latter feature is an hourglass-shaped cavity or superbubble in the interstellar medium roughly 300 light-years across. The bubble is suffused with high-temperature plasma, suggesting that it may be the product of several recent supernovae.

The Local Bubble is a small superbubble compared to the neighbouring wider Radcliffe Wave and Split linear structures (formerly Gould Belt), each of which are some thousands of light-years in length. All these structures are part of the Orion Arm, which contains most of the stars in the Milky Way that are visible to the unaided eye. The density of all matter in the local neighborhood is ·pc−3.

Within ten light-years of the Sun there are relatively few stars, the closest being the triple star system Alpha Centauri, which is about 4.4 light-years away and may be in the Local Bubble's G-Cloud. Alpha Centauri A and B are a closely tied pair of Sun-like stars, whereas the closest star to Earth, the small red dwarf Proxima Centauri, orbits the pair at a distance of 0.2 light-year. In 2016, a potentially habitable exoplanet was found to be orbiting Proxima Centauri, called Proxima Centauri b, the closest confirmed exoplanet to the Sun.

The next closest known fusors to the Sun are the red dwarfs Barnard's Star (at 5.9 ly), Wolf 359 (7.8 ly), and Lalande 21185 (8.3 ly). The nearest brown dwarfs belong to the binary Luhman 16 system (6.6 ly), and the closest known rogue or free-floating planetary-mass object at less than 10 Jupiter masses is the sub-brown dwarf WISE 0855−0714 (7.4 ly).

Just beyond at 8.6 ly lies Sirius, the brightest star in Earth's night sky, with roughly twice the Sun's mass, orbited by the closest white dwarf to Earth, Sirius B. Other stars within ten light-years are the binary red-dwarf system Luyten 726-8 (8.7 ly) and the solitary red dwarf Ross 154 (9.7 ly). The closest solitary Sun-like star to the Solar System is Tau Ceti at 11.9 light-years. It has roughly 80% of the Sun's mass but only about half of its luminosity.

The nearest and unaided-visible group of stars beyond the immediate celestial neighbourhood is the Ursa Major Moving Group at roughly 80 light-years, which is within the Local Bubble, like the nearest as well as unaided-visible star cluster the Hyades, which lie at its edge. The closest star-forming regions are the Corona Australis Molecular Cloud, the Rho Ophiuchi cloud complex and the Taurus molecular cloud; the latter lies just beyond the Local Bubble and is part of the Radcliffe wave.

Comparison with extrasolar systems 
Compared to many extrasolar systems, the Solar System stands out in lacking planets interior to the orbit of Mercury. The known Solar System also lacks super-Earths, planets between one and ten times as massive as the Earth, although the hypothetical Planet Nine, if it does exist, could be a super-Earth beyond the Solar System as we understand it today. Uncommonly, it has only small rocky planets and large gas giants; elsewhere planets of intermediate size are typical—both rocky and gas—so there is no "gap" as seen between the size of Earth and of Neptune (with a radius 3.8 times as large). As many of these super-Earths are closer to their respective stars than Mercury is to the sun, a hypothesis has arisen that all planetary systems start with many close-in planets, and that typically a sequence of their collisions causes consolidation of mass into few larger planets, but in case of the Solar System the collisions caused their destruction and ejection.

The orbits of Solar System planets are nearly circular. Compared to other systems, they have smaller orbital eccentricity. Although there are attempts to explain it partly with a bias in the radial-velocity detection method and partly with long interactions of a quite high number of planets, the exact causes remain undetermined.

Humanity's perspective 

Humanity's knowledge of the Solar System has grown incrementally over the centuries. Up to the Late Middle Ages–Renaissance, astronomers from Europe to India believed Earth to be stationary at the centre of the Universe and categorically different from the divine or ethereal objects that moved through the sky. Although the Greek philosopher Aristarchus of Samos had speculated on a heliocentric reordering of the cosmos, Nicolaus Copernicus was the first person known to have developed a mathematically predictive heliocentric system. Heliocentrism did not triumph immediately over geocentrism, but the work of Copernicus had its champions, notably Johannes Kepler. Using a heliocentric model that improved upon Copernicus by allowing orbits to be elliptical as well as circular, and the precise observational data of Tycho Brahe, Kepler produced the Rudolphine Tables, which enabled accurate computations of the positions of the then-known planets. Pierre Gassendi used them to predict a transit of Mercury in 1631, and Jeremiah Horrocks did the same for a transit of Venus in 1639. This provided a strong vindication of heliocentrism and Kepler's elliptical orbits.

In the 17th century, Galileo publicized the use of the telescope in astronomy; he and Simon Marius independently discovered that Jupiter had four satellites in orbit around it. Christiaan Huygens followed on from these observations by discovering Saturn's moon Titan and the shape of the rings of Saturn. In 1677, Edmond Halley observed a transit of Mercury across the Sun, leading him to realise that observations of the solar parallax of a planet (more ideally using the transit of Venus) could be used to trigonometrically determine the distances between Earth, Venus, and the Sun. Halley's friend Isaac Newton, in his magisterial Principia Mathematica of 1687, demonstrated that celestial bodies are not quintessentially different from Earthly ones: the same laws of motion and of gravity apply on Earth and in the skies.

The term "Solar System" entered the English language by 1704, when John Locke used it to refer to the Sun, planets, and comets. In 1705, Halley realised that repeated sightings of a comet were of the same object, returning regularly once every 75–76 years. This was the first evidence that anything other than the planets repeatedly orbited the Sun, though Seneca had theorized this about comets in the 1st century. Uranus, having occasionally been observed since antiquity, was recognized to be a planet orbiting beyond Saturn by 1783. In 1838, Friedrich Bessel successfully measured a stellar parallax, an apparent shift in the position of a star created by Earth's motion around the Sun, providing the first direct, experimental proof of heliocentrism. Neptune was identified as a planet some years later, in 1846, thanks to its gravitational pull causing a slight but detectable variation in the orbit of Uranus.

In the 20th century, humans began their space exploration around the Solar System, starting with placing telescopes in space. All eight planets have been visited by space probes. This began with Pioneer 10’s encounter with Jupiter, and Pioneer 11’s encounter with Saturn. The remaining gas giants were first visited by the Voyager spacecraft, one of which (Voyager 1) is the furthest object made by humankind and the first in interstellar space. In addition, probes have also returned samples from comets and asteroids, as well as flown through the Sun's corona and made fly-bys of Kuiper belt objects. Six of the planets (all but Uranus and Neptune) have or had a dedicated orbiter.

See also 

 List of gravitationally rounded objects of the Solar System
 List of Solar System objects by size
 Lists of geological features of the Solar System
 List of Solar System extremes
 Outline of the Solar System

Notes

References

External links 

 
 If the Moon were only 1 Pixel: A Tediously Accurate Map of the Solar System (web based scroll map scaled to the Moon being 1 pixel)
 NASA's Eyes on the Solar System
 NASA's Solar System Exploration
 NASA's Solar System Simulator

 
Planetary science
Space science
Planetary systems with eight confirmed planets